Albury Wodonga Football Association is a soccer league encompassing much of North East Victoria & the Southern Riverina. The association's headquarters and half of the clubs are based in the City Of Albury (New South Wales), and are affiliated under the auspices of Football New South Wales (FNSW). The clubs based in Victoria, whilst affiliated from a registration point of view with Football Federation Victoria (FFV), are governed by FNSW.. Their mission statement is to be an organisation which designs, organises, implements, and controls football activities; coordinates, advises and supports member clubs; represents the sport and its members at the regional, state and national level and plans and organises sponsorship and promotion so that people can participate, enjoy and achieve through playing football."

History
The association was formed in 1973 as the "Albury Wodonga Soccer Association". The association was known as "Soccer Albury Wodonga" from the 1990s until the early 2000s, when the association was renamed as part of Football Federation Australia's re-branding of the game in Australia.

Format

The league sits below the Victorian State League Division 5 and forms a part of the "Ninth tier" of league soccer in Australia. It is primarily staged in the Australian winter and, in its current format, runs between March and September. The league comprises teams based in the Australian states of Victoria & New South Wales, while the Football Federation Victoria is the governing body.

Each league comprises twelve teams competing in a number of competition. Every team plays each other twice over the course of a 24-week season, with two general bye rounds.

Promotion and Relegation:
Currently there is no "Second Division" of the Albury Wodonga Football Association, so there is no promotion or relegation. The twelve clubs field teams in 14 competitions, nine of which are age-restricted competitions.

There is no promotion or relegation between the Albury Wodonga Football Association (Level 9) and the Victorian State League Division 5 (Level 8), however clubs may apply to join the VSL.

 The latest club to join the association was the "Cobram Roar" in 2016 from the "Goulburn North East Football Association".
 The most recent club to leave the association was the "Benalla Rovers" in 2015 for the "Goulburn North East Football Association".

Cups and Finals

Albury Wodonga Football Association League Cup
Currently the finals series also doubles as a "League Cup", where the top 8 teams play in a knockout style tournament over 3 weeks.

Dockerty Cup and FFA Cup
Since the 2016 season Albury Wodonga Football Association clubs have taken part in the FFA Cup preliminary rounds, which also double as the initial rounds of the Dockerty Cup. Fixtures are randomly drawn as single-leg knockout matches. Currently all Victorian Regional Leagues clubs enter at the "First Qualifying Round", and only the last 4 Victorian clubs will qualify for the final rounds of the competition (at the Round of 32). To date, no Albury Wodonga Football Association club has advanced beyond the third preliminary round.

Media coverage
Radio:
Radio station 2AY broadcasts a segment titled "The Critic" every Saturday morning between 10:00am and 1:00pm, while mainly focusing on the local Australian Football scene it occasionally covers the AWFA. ABC Goulburn Murray also covers the league during the "Local Grandstand" program every Saturday morning between 08:00am and 10:00am.
Television:
Local TV news broadcasts from Prime7 News & WIN News air weekend match highlights including player and coaching staff interviews, as well as covering all scores.

Newspapers:
Print coverage is generally scant when compared to the Australian Football coverage in the region's major daily newspaper, "The Border Mail".  More coverage is provided by local newspaper's "Wangaratta Chronicle", "The Alpine Observer", "Myrtleford Times".

Live Match Coverage:
live Twitter feeds of some matches are provided by a team of media representatives, this may very depending on clubs.

Video Highlights:
Albury Wodonga Football Association produce regular highlights videos which are published on social media and their respective association & club websites.  Some clubs air a "TeamTV" channel via YouTube or club websites, covers AWFA team match highlights including player and coaching staff interviews.

Albury Wodonga Football Association clubs

2019 Affiliated Clubs

Notes

Former affiliated clubs

Honors

Note: Information has been sourced from websites including those of Albury-Wodonga Football Association, Albury United and Albury Hotspurs.

References

External links

Soccer leagues in Victoria (Australia)
Sport in Albury, New South Wales